() is a governmental office or title used in Iceland, the Faroe Islands, and Norway.

He was also to hold courts of justice and name men to sit on juries. He sometimes also assigned fiefs to a lensmann. The system was established in the 12th century by Sverre of Norway to help consolidate his power following the Battle of Fimreite. As Norse influence spread, so did the  system, reaching into Iceland and the Faroe Islands, as well as Orkney and Shetland.

Iceland 
Appointed by the King of Norway, it was possible for a single  to oversee up to a quarter of the island through representatives stations through his assigned . In 1375 a group of prominent Icelanders declared they would no longer accept non-native , nor royal amendments not sanctioned by the Alþingi.

Currently there are nine district commissioners that manage several types of public services in their districts, including collecting taxes outside of the capital area, handling civil marriages, inheritance, child custody and issuing various permits.

Faroe Islands 
As in Iceland, the  system was brought to the Faroe Islands in the 13th century as the Norwegian king exerted greater influence over the islands. Traditionally, there were six , one for each .

Today,  are the modern district sheriffs appointed to three-year terms.

Svalbard 
In Norway, the term  is used for the Governor of Svalbard; however, after 1 July 2021, it was replaced by the gender-neutral term  as part of Norwegian effort to ensure that governmental terms are not distinctly masculine or feminine.

From 1931 to 1933, the term  was also used for the governor of Erik the Red's Land, Norway's claim on eastern Greenland.

References 

Government agencies of Iceland
Law enforcement in Iceland
Law enforcement in the Faroe Islands
Society of Norway
Norwegian nobility